Von Bulow v. Von Bulow, 811 F.2d 136 (2nd Cir. 1987), was a case appealed from a contempt ruling after a United States District Court rejected the claim of a reporter's privilege by Claus von Bulow and Andrea Reynolds.

Reynolds, a paralegal, appealed a contempt ruling after she refused to submit an unpublished document for discovery.  The United States Court of Appeals for the Second Circuit upheld the contempt order.  The Court reasoned that a person who had gathered information for private use without the intent to gather the information as part of an investigation for a publication was not entitled to a reporter's privilege.

See also
First Amendment to the United States Constitution
Branzburg v. Hayes
In re Madden

References

United States Court of Appeals for the Second Circuit cases
1987 in United States case law
United States discovery case law